Parnamirim is a city  in the state of Pernambuco, Brazil. The population in 2020, according with IBGE was 22,106 and the area is 2609.5 km². It is also, the start point of BR 232, one important federal highway.

Geography

 State - Pernambuco
 Region - Sertão Pernambucano
 Boundaries - Granito, Serrita and Bodocó   (N);  Santa Maria da Boa Vista and Orocó  (S);  Terra Nova and Cabrobó  (E);  Ouricuri and Santa Cruz   (W)
 Area - 2.608.07 km²
 Elevation - 392 m
 Hydrography - Brigida and Terra Nova rivers
 Vegetation - Caatinga Hiperxerófila
 Climate - semi arid - hot and dry
 Annual average temperature - 26.0 c
 Distance to Recife - 554 km

Economy

The main economic activities in Parnamirim are commerce and agribusiness, especially farming of goats, cattle, sheep, pigs, chickens;  and plantations of onions, beans and water melons.

Economic Indicators

Economy by Sector
2006

Health Indicators

References

Municipalities in Pernambuco